Meagan C. Simonaire (born August 8, 1990) is a former American politician from Maryland and was the youngest member of the Maryland General Assembly. She represented House District 31B (which includes Pasadena and portions of Glen Burnie, Millersville and Severna Park) in the Maryland House of Delegates from 2014 to 2018. She is the daughter of Maryland State Senator Bryan Simonaire.

Early life 

Simonaire is the third of seven brothers and sisters, and spent most of her childhood in the Middle East where her father worked as an engineer for Northrop Grumman.
 
After she moved to the U.S., she attended Bob Jones University in South Carolina to study cosmetology.

Political career

Maryland House of Delegates 

Simonaire was elected to the House of Delegates in 2014 to one of the two seats in House District 31B. After a competitive primary, Simonaire beat out several other candidates to win a seat alongside then House Minority Leader Nic Kipke, replacing incumbent Don Dwyer who was defeated after a string of legal issues.

Views on conversion therapy 
Simonaire publicly came out as bisexual in April 2018 while supporting a bill banning conversion therapy for LGBT teens. In a speech on the House floor, she claimed her parents suggested conversion therapy after she came out to them in January 2015. Her father, Senator Bryan Simonaire, disputed her story and continued to oppose the bill. The bill was ultimately passed by both the House of Delegates and Senate.

Elected as a Republican, Simonaire joined the Democratic Party on October 15, 2018.

Personal life  

Simonaire chose not to run for reelection in 2018 and retired from elected office due to her changing views. She is working as a cosmetic tattoo artist, specializing in eyebrow tattooing. She provides free services to burn patients, cancer patients, domestic violence survivors, and human trafficking survivors.

Electoral history  

2014 Republican Primary Election for Maryland House of Delegates – District 31B
Voters to choose two:
{| class="wikitable"
|-
!Name
!Votes
!Percent
!Outcome
|-
|Nic Kipke, Rep.
|3,920
|  31.00%
|   Won
|-
|Meagan Simonaire, Rep.
|3,075
|  24.30%
|   Won
|-
|Gus Kurtz, Rep.
|1,779
|  14.10%
|   Lost
|-
|Brian A. Chisholm, Rep.
|1,607
|  12.70%
|   Lost
|-
|Faith M. Loudon, Rep.
|1,017
|    8.10%
|   Lost
|-
|Don Dwyer, Jr., Rep.
|   890
|    7.00%
|   Lost
|-
|Paul William Drgos, Jr., Rep.
|   230
|    1.80%
|   Lost
|-
|David Lee Therrien, Rep.
|   111
|    0.90%
|   Lost
|}

2014 Race for Maryland House of Delegates – 31B District
Voters to choose two:
{| class="wikitable"
|-
! Name !! Votes !! Percent !! Outcome
|- 
| Nic Kipke, Republican || 20,858 ||   39.9% ||   Won
|- 
| Meagan C. Simonaire, Republican || 19,555 ||   37.4% ||   Won
|- 
| Jeremiah Chiappelli, Democratic ||   6,332 ||   12.1% ||    Lost
|- 
| Doug Morris, Democratic ||   5,394 ||   10.3% ||    Lost
|-
| Other Write-Ins ||        88 ||     0.2% || 
|}

References

1990 births
21st-century American women politicians
21st-century American politicians
Bisexual politicians
Bisexual women
Bob Jones University alumni
LGBT state legislators in Maryland
Living people
Maryland Democrats
Maryland Republicans
Members of the Maryland House of Delegates
People from Pasadena, Maryland
Women state legislators in Maryland